Saint-Sulpice (Berrichon: Saint-Spi) is a commune in the Nièvre department in central France.

History
The Romans built the Roman road from Nevers to Alluy, of which only a few sections remain towards Sury in Saint-Jean-aux-Amognes and the place called the Forest in the town.

During the revolutionary period of the National Convention (1792-1795), the town bore the name of Roche-la-Montagne.

See also
Communes of the Nièvre department

References

Communes of Nièvre